Henry Rust Mighels (November 5, 1830 – May 27, 1879) was a US journalist and politician. A writer of the Sagebrush School, he was the editor and publisher of Carson City, Nevada's Nevada Appeal. He was born in Norway, Maine. He served in the Union Army during the American Civil War as assistant adjutant general, with the rank of captain, and was wounded in action. In 1868, he was elected State Printer and served a two-year term. In 1876, he was elected to the Nevada Assembly, serving as Speaker in 1877. The following year, he ran unsuccessfully for Lieutenant Governor of Nevada. He was also an artist, painting still life and landscapes. His one book, Sage Brush Leaves (1879), consists of literary essays. He died of cancer in 1879 in Carson City and is buried at Lone Mountain Cemetery next to his wife Nellie Verrill Mighels Davis (who subsequently married Samuel Post Davis). The Mighels had three sons, including Henry R. Mighels Jr. and Philip Verrill Mighels; and two daughters. Henry J. Mighels Jr. took over as editor of the Appeal in 1898. Philip's ex-wife, Ella Sterling Mighels, was the "First Literary Historian of California".

Partial works
 Sage Brush Leaves (1879)

References

External links
 
A Guide to the Henry R. Mighels Correspondence, 93-05. Special Collections, University Libraries, University of Nevada, Reno.
A Guide to the Mighels family papers, NC470. Special Collections, University Libraries, University of Nevada, Reno.
A Guide to the Henry Mighels papers, 89-22. Special Collections, University Libraries, University of Nevada, Reno.

1879 deaths
People from Norway, Maine
American newspaper publishers (people)
Journalists from Nevada
Politicians from Carson City, Nevada
1830 births
Union Army officers
Speakers of the Nevada Assembly
Sagebrush School
19th-century American journalists
American male journalists
19th-century American male writers
19th-century American politicians
19th-century American businesspeople